The Bafut language, Fut, is an Eastern Grassfields language of the Niger–Congo languages, and related to Bamum. Oral tradition traces dynastic origins to the Ndobo or Tikari areas. It is spoken by people of Bafut Subdivision, Tuba, in the division of Mezam and in the division of Metchum in Northwest Province, Cameroon.

The Bafut language was alphabetized by SIL International consultant Joseph Mfonyam in 1982. Since then, some literature has been translated into Bafut, most notably the New Testament in 2000.

Writing system

References

External links 
 ELAR archive of Bafut

Ngemba languages
Languages of Cameroon